Saint-Jean-la-Fouillouse is a village and commune in the Lozère department in southern France.

Geography
The river Chapeauroux forms most part of the commune's south-eastern border.

See also
Communes of the Lozère department

References

Saintjeanlafouillouse